Yury Nikandrov (22 November 1923 – 21 December 2018) was a Russian sport shooter who competed in the 1952 Summer Olympics, in the 1956 Summer Olympics, and in the 1960 Summer Olympics.

References

1923 births
2018 deaths
Russian male sport shooters
Soviet male sport shooters
Olympic shooters of the Soviet Union
Shooters at the 1952 Summer Olympics
Shooters at the 1956 Summer Olympics
Shooters at the 1960 Summer Olympics
Sportspeople from Moscow